Alali Adamso (born 1963) is an Israeli politician who served as a member of the Knesset for Likud from 2012 to 2013.

Biography
Adamso was born in Ethiopia and made aliyah to Israel in 1983. He studied at Tel Aviv University, earning a BA in Economics and Political Science and a BA in Public Policy. After completing his national service, he worked in the United States before returning to Israel to work at the Industry, Trade and Labor Ministry.

In 1990 he joined the Likud party, and became a member of its central committee in 1999. He was placed 28th on the party's list for the 2009 elections, but missed out as the party won only 27 seats. However, he entered the Knesset on 16 September 2012 as a replacement for Yossi Peled. Prior to the 2013 elections he was placed 71st on the joint Likud Yisrael Beiteinu list, losing his seat as the alliance won only 31 seats.

References

External links
 

1963 births
Living people
Black Jewish members of the Knesset
Ethiopian emigrants to Israel
Ethiopian Jews
Israeli Jews
Jewish Israeli politicians
Israeli people of Ethiopian-Jewish descent
Likud politicians
Members of the 18th Knesset (2009–2013)
People from Amhara Region
Tel Aviv University alumni